Stefano Ianni and Florin Mergea were the defending champions, but decided not to participate.

Ken and Neal Skupski won the title, defeating Mikhail Elgin and Uladzimir Ignatik in the final, 6–3, 6–7(4–7), [10–6].

Seeds

Draw

Draw

References
 Main Draw

Doubles
Open Castilla y León doubles
2013 ATP Challenger Tour